Radčice is a municipality and village in Jablonec nad Nisou District in the Liberec Region of the Czech Republic. It has about 200 inhabitants.

Notable people
Václav Dobiáš (1909–1978), composer

References

Villages in Jablonec nad Nisou District